This is a list of international schools in Japan.

By location

Hokkaido

Hokkaido International School

Kyoto 
 KIU Academy 
 Kyoto International School

Kobe

Canadian Academy
Marist Brothers International School
*[Kansai International Academy, Kobe]

Osaka

Osaka International School
Osaka YMCA International School

Nagano
UWC ISAK Japan

Nagoya
International Christian Academy of Nagoya (Now Closed)
Nagoya International School
NUCB International College
Enishi International School

Sendai

Tohoku International School

Tokyo
American School in Japan
Aoba - Japan International School
Bunka Suginami Canadian International School
The British School in Tokyo
Canadian International School
Christian Academy in Japan
Gyosei International School
Horizon Japan International School
International School of the Sacred Heart
Joy to the World American International School
K. International School Tokyo
KAIS International School
Laurus International School of Science Tokyo
Lycée Français International de Tokyo
New International School (Tokyo)
Nishimachi International School
St. Mary's International School
Seisen International School
Shinagawa International School
Tokyo International School
Tokyo West International School
Global Indian International School
Yoyogi International School
Sai Sishya International School

Kawasaki
Kohana International School

Tsukuba

Tsukuba International School

Yokohama

Horizon Japan International School
Saint Maur International School
Yokohama International School

Okinawa 

 Okinawa International School
 Okinawa Christian School International
 Hope International Academy Okinawa

See also

List of schools in Japan
List of international schools

International schools in Japan
International
Japan